Wolfgang Amadeus Mozart's Piano Sonata No. 3 in B major, K. 281 / 189f, (1774) is a piano sonata in three movements:

A typical performance takes about 14 minutes.

This piano sonata is one of the most virtuosic pieces Mozart ever composed, written during the visit Mozart paid to Munich for the production of La finta giardiniera from late 1774 to the beginning of the following March.

External links

  (Alte Mozart-Ausgabe version)

Piano Sonata 03
Compositions in B-flat major
1774 compositions